Tamir is a male Hebrew name תָּמִיר meaning tall. A different Hebrew spelling, טמיר, means arcane, secretive.

It is also a common Mongolian name, where it refers to strength/vigor, as well as the Tamir River.

People

Given name
 Tamir Ben Ami, Israeli footballer and manager
 Tamir Blatt (born 1997), Israeli basketball player in the Israel Basketball Premier League
 Tamir Bloom (born 1971), American épée fencer; 2x US champion
 Tamir Cohen, Israeli soccer midfielder (Bolton Wanderers & Israeli national team)
 Tamir Goodman (born 1982), Israeli-American basketball shooting guard
 Tamir Kahlon, Israeli footballer
 Tamir Linhart, Israeli footballer
 Tamir Muskat, Israeli musician
 Tamir Rice, American shooting victim
 Tamir Pardo, Israeli intelligence officer
Tamir Saban (born 1999), American-Israeli basketball player 
 Tamir Sapir, Soviet-born American businessman
 Andryein Tamir, Mongolian swimmer

Surname
 Amit Tamir, Israeli basketball center/forward (Hapoel Jerusalem)
 Arnon Tamir, Israeli footballer
 Avital Tamir, Israeli musician
 Avraham Tamir, Israeli major general
 Doron Tamir, Israeli military officer
 Nadav Tamir, Israeli diplomat
 Shmuel Tamir, Israeli independence fighter and politician
 Yuli Tamir, Israeli academic and politician

Fictional characters

References

Hebrew masculine given names
Mongolian given names